Lincoln Plaza can mean:

 1 Lincoln Plaza in New York City
 Lincoln Plaza at SunTrust Center in Orlando, Florida
 Lincoln Plaza (London), on the Isle of Dogs in London
 Ross Tower in Dallas, Texas, known as Lincoln Plaza until 2013